The 1909 Saint Louis Blue and White football team was an American football team that represented Saint Louis University during the 1909 college football season. In its first and only season under head coach Bill Warner, the team compiled a 3–5 record and was outscored by a total of 84 to 74.

Schedule

References

Saint Louis
Saint Louis Billikens football seasons
Saint Louis Blue and White football